John Franklin Carter a.k.a. Jay Franklin a.k.a. Diplomat a.k.a. Unofficial Observer (1897–1967) was an American journalist, columnist, biographer and novelist.  He notably wrote the syndicated column, "We the People", under his pen name Jay Franklin. He wrote over 30 books on a variety of subjects, including his detective novels about the character Dennis Tyler.  In his column, he was one of the few who predicted Truman's victory in the 1948 presidential election.

Biography
Carter was born in Fall River, Massachusetts on April 27, 1897, as one of seven children of The Rev. John Franklin Carter.  He attended Yale University, where he served as chairman of campus humor magazine The Yale Record

He left Yale early to serve as a representative of the Williamstown Institute of Politics in Italy.  Afterwards, he became the Rome correspondent for the London Daily Chronicle and the New York Times.

In 1928, Carter began working for the State Department as an economic specialist.

In 1935, he was hired by Rexford Tugwell as information chief for the newly created Resettlement Administration. The documentary filmmaker Pare Lorentz worked under his supervision.

Carter then became a correspondent for the magazines Liberty and Vanity Fair.

In 1941, Carter was appointed by President Franklin Delano Roosevelt to conduct investigation into the loyalty of Japanese American communities on the West Coast of the United States. Carter hired Curtis B. Munson to compile the Report on Japanese on the West Coast of the United States.

He wrote the syndicated column, "We, The People"  from 1936 to 1948 under his pen name "Jay Franklin". It chronicled the Franklin D. Roosevelt and Truman Administrations.

In 1948, Carter worked as a speech writer for Harry S. Truman.

Carter died in Washington, D.C., on November 28, 1967, at the age of 70.  His books The New Dealers (1934) and American Messiahs (1935) remain valuable sources for historians of the New Deal era.

Works
Detective novels written as "Diplomat"
 Murder in the Embassy (1930)
 Murder in the State Department (1930)
 Scandal in the Chancery (1931)
 The Corpse on the White House Lawn (1932)
 Death in the Senate (1933)
 Slow Death at Geneva (1934)
 The Brain Trust Murder (1935)
 
Partial list of other novels
 The Rat Race (1950)
 Champagne Charlie (1950)

Political Narrative written as "Unofficial Observer"
 The New Dealers (1934)
 American Messiahs (1935)

Non-fiction
 Remaking America. Boston, Houghton Mifflin Company, 1942. Also available from Hathi Trust.

References

Simkin, John. "John Franklin Carter". Spartacus Educational. Retrieved 2018-06-06.

For more on Carter's role in war-time intelligence, see

External links
John Franklin Carter papers at the University of Wyoming - American Heritage Center
John Franklin Carter correspondence at the Franklin D. Roosevelt Library, Hyde Park, NY and online via U.S. Archives
 
 
 

1897 births
1967 deaths
20th-century American novelists
American male biographers
American columnists
American fantasy writers
American male novelists
American mystery writers
American science fiction writers
People from Fall River, Massachusetts
Novelists from Massachusetts
20th-century American biographers
20th-century American male writers